The Asian Pacific American Medical Student Association (APAMSA), founded in 1995, is the nation's largest organization representing Asian Pacific Islander American (APIA) medical students.  APAMSA is a student-governed and national organization that promotes awareness and advocacy of issues affecting the APIA community.  They have over 4,500 active medical students, pre-medical students, interns, medical residents, and practicing physicians.

APAMSA hosts an annual National Conference and a Hepatitis B Conference in the fall. The 2019 National Conference was hosted at New York University on October 4–6.

Currently, APAMSA has over 120 local chapters at different medical schools and college campuses (prehealth) in the United States.

Previous work

Disparities in Medical Education: In 2007, APAMSA conducted a national study to reveal racial and ethnic disparities in medical school grades during clinical years.  The study demonstrated that minorities receive lower grades than white medical students.  This study served to show the possibility that cultural factors may play a role in medical school grades during clinical years.  In 2009, APAMSA followed up with a second study to examine medical student communication styles.  The study concluded that there were differences in student communication styles and feedback based on demographic differences suggesting a need for cultural competency training for both medical student and teacher.

Bone Marrow Drive: During the Presidential Inaugural Committee's National Day of Service, APAMSA helped organize the Gift of Hope, Gift of Unity Marrow Drives in Washington DC and in California with Yul Kwon and the national bone marrow programs: NMDP, AADP (Asian American Donor Program), A3M, and SAMAR.  In 2009, APAMSA also launched the 1000 CRANES for HOPE Campaign to register at least 1000 minorities onto the National Bone Marrow Registry.

Hepatitis B:  Since 2006, APAMSA has contributed to help raise awareness about Hepatitis B and liver disease in the APA community by Hepatitis B, APAMSA Fights to Break the Hepatitis B Cycle.  This campaign brought together a national cross section of medical students and physicians dedicated to ending the epidemic of hepatitis B in APA community, and the launching of several local hepatitis B education and screening programs across the United States.

Japan Tsunami Relief:  In 2011 in response to the devastating earthquake and tsunami in Japan, APAMSA chapters throughout the United States raised a combined total of over $11,000 which was ultimately donated to aid the recovery effort in Japan.  The Albert Einstein College of Medicine was recognized as the top fundraiser in the effort as they raised a total of $6508.32.

AllofUs Research Initiative: In 2018, APAMSA was chosen as one of only two national AANHPI-serving organization partners in the Asian Engagement and Recruitment Core (ARC) for the All of Us Research Program (AoURP). With the assistance of the ARC, students and community members were enrolled at local health fairs and community events to be a part of the program and increase AANHPI representation in the AoURP for future clinical trials and biomedical research.

National initiatives
 Hepatitis B and C Initiative and Conference
 Community Outreach Initiative
 Bone Marrow Initiative
 Cancer Initiative
 Global Health Initiative
 Health Education Initiative
 Academic Education Initiative
 Premedical Students Initiative
 Diversity Initiative
 Alumni Initiative
 Health Advocacy Initiative
 AAPI Advocacy Initiative

History
APAMSA officially started in 1995 by Dr. B Li and his colleagues with the first National Conference after they were worried about the future of APA medical students and communities.   Since then, APAMSA has grown to include many National Programs including the Hepatitis B education and immunization project and the Bone Marrow Donation project.

As an organization based on health care, APAMSA has also held a prominent role in speaking out for smoking and tobacco use targeting the Asian community, for irresponsible alcohol use, for immunization and for health standards addressing needs of the medically underserved. So far efforts have been met with great success as smoking and alcohol consumption, along with related chronic illnesses, have been on the rise in Asian youth since 2003.

National conferences 
Initially, National Conference was a one-day event, usually held on a Saturday. Occasionally there has been expansion to 2–3 days with additional pre-conference activities the Friday afternoon/night before (Pre-Med Day, Anti-Racism Workshop) or the following Sunday (Transition meeting).

At the 26th National Conference (2019), the first "Alumni Day" was held with good turn out from local physicians and healthy discussion on how to best support the next generation of Asian American health professionals.

Historical national conferences

Historical national presidents

References

External links
 

Medical associations based in the United States
Medical and health student organizations
Student organizations in the United States
Ethnic student organizations